This is a list of economic crises and depressions.

1st century
Financial crisis of 33. 
The result of the mass issuance of unsecured loans by main Roman banking houses.

3rd century
Crisis of the Third Century

7th century
Coin exchange crisis of 692. Byzantine emperor Justinian II refuses to accept tribute from the Umayyad Caliphate with new Arab gold coins for fear of exposing double counting in the Byzantine financial system (actual weight less, than nominal quantity), which leads to the Battle of Sebastopolis and the revolt of taxpayers who burned financial officials in a copper bull. Justinian II was tortured by cutting off his nose in front of spectators at the Hippodrome.  Twenty Years' Anarchy begins.

14th century
14th century banking crisis (the crash of the Peruzzi and the Bardi family Compagnia dei Bardi in 1345).

17th century
Kipper und Wipper (1618–22) financial crisis at the start of the Thirty Years' War
Tulip mania (1637) an economic bubble that burst, hurting the economy of the Dutch Republic
The General Crisis (1640) Arguably the largest worldwide crisis in history

18th century
Great Tobacco Depression (1703) (British America)
South Sea Bubble (1720) (UK)
Mississippi Company (1720) (France)
 Crisis of 1763 – started in Amsterdam, begun by the collapse of Leendert Pieter de Neufville and Johann Ernst Gotzkowsky, spread to Germany and Scandinavia
Great East Indian Bengal Bubble Crash (1769) (India) Crash started by the rapid overvaluation of the East India Company.
Crisis of 1772 – started in London and Amsterdam, began by the collapse of the bankers; Neal, James, Fordyce, and Down.
War of American Independence Financing Crisis (1776) (United States) – The French Revolution was initiated by its 1.4 billion livre investment here; Spain invested 700 million reales into fighting
 Panic of 1785 – United States
Panic of 1792 – United States
Panic of 1796–1797 – Britain and United States

19th century
Danish state bankruptcy of 1813
Post-Napoleonic depression (post-1815) (England)
Panic of 1819, a U.S. recession with bank failures; culmination of U.S.'s first boom-to-bust economic cycle
Panic of 1825, a pervasive British recession in which many banks failed, nearly including the Bank of England
Panic of 1837, a U.S. recession with bank failures, followed by a 5-year depression
Panic of 1847, started as a collapse of British financial markets associated with the end of the 1840s railway industry boom
Panic of 1857, a U.S. recession with bank failures
Panic of 1866, was an international financial downturn that accompanied the failure of Overend, Gurney and Company in London
Great Depression of British Agriculture (1873–1896)
Long Depression (1873–1896)
Panic of 1873, a US recession with bank failures, followed by a four-year depression
Panic of 1884
Panic of 1890
Panic of 1893, a US recession with bank failures
Australian banking crisis of 1893
Panic of 1896

20th century

1900s
Panic of 1901, a U.S. economic recession that started with a fight for financial control of the Northern Pacific Railway
Panic of 1907, a U.S. economic recession with bank failures

1920s
Depression of 1920–21, a U.S. economic recession following the end of WW1.
Wall Street Crash of 1929 and Great Depression (1929–1939) the worst depression of modern history

1970s
1970s energy crisis
OPEC oil price shock (1973)
1979 energy crisis (1979)
Secondary banking crisis of 1973–1975 in the UK
Latin American debt crisis (late 1970s, early 1980s) known as "lost decade"

1980s
Early 1980s Recession
Chilean crisis of 1982
Bank stock crisis (Israel 1983)
Japanese asset price bubble (1986–1992)
Black Monday (1987) (1987) (US)
Savings and loan crisis failure of 1,043 out of the 3,234 S&Ls from 1986 to 1995 in the U.S.

1990s
Special Period in Cuba (1990–1994)
Early 1990s Recession
1991 Indian economic crisis
Finnish banking crisis (1990s) (1991–1993)
Sweden financial crisis 1990–1994
Black Wednesday (1992)
Mexican peso crisis
1997 Asian financial crisis
1998 Russian financial crisis
1998–1999 Ecuador economic crisis
1998–2002 Argentine great depression
Samba effect (1999) (Brazil)

21st century

2000s
1998–2002 Argentine great depression
Early 2000s recession
Dot-com bubble (2000–2002) (US)
2001 Turkish economic crisis
2001 September 11 Attacks
2002 Uruguay banking crisis
Venezuelan general strike of 2002–03
Finance company collapses, 2006–2012 (New Zealand)
Financial crisis of 2007–2008 
Great Recession (worldwide)
2000s energy crisis (2003–2009) oil price bubble
Subprime mortgage crisis (US) (2007–2010)
United States housing bubble and United States housing market correction (US) (2003–2011)
Automotive industry crisis of 2008–2010 (US)
2008–2011 Icelandic financial crisis
2008–2010 Irish banking crisis
Russian financial crisis of 2008–2009
2008 Latvian financial crisis
Venezuelan banking crisis of 2009–10
2008-14 Spanish financial crisis

2010s
European sovereign debt crisis (EU) (2009–2019)
Greek government-debt crisis (2009–2019)
2010–2014 Portuguese financial crisis
2012–2013 Cypriot financial crisis (2012–2013)
Crisis in Venezuela (2012–now)
Russo-Ukrainian War (2014–now)
2014 Russian financial crisis
2014–2017 Brazilian economic crisis
2015 Chinese stock market crash
Turkish currency and debt crisis, 2018
Argentine monetary crisis

2020s
COVID-19 recession / Economic impact of the COVID-19 pandemic (2020–present day)
2020 stock market crash (2020)
Black Monday (9 March)
Black Thursday (12 March)
Lebanese liquidity crisis
Sri Lankan economic crisis
2020–2022 Chinese property sector crisis
2022 Pakistan economic crisis
2022 Russian financial crisis

See also
Financial crisis and economic collapse
Currency crisis, hyperinflation and devaluation
Banking crisis, credit crunch, bank run
Savings and loan crisis
Balance of payments crisis
Depression (economics), recession, stagflation, jobless recovery
Economic bubble, stock market bubble and real estate bubble
Market correction, nominal price, equilibrium price
Kondratiev wave, business cycle and business cycle models
Boom and bust
Involuntary unemployment
Fictitious capital, Intrinsic value, Speculation
Crisis theory, tendency of the rate of profit to fall, reserve army of labour
Overproduction, underconsumption and demand shortfall
Consolidation (business), industrial consolidation, market concentration
Capital flight, capital strike, urban blight, deindustrialization
Wage-price spiral
List of banking crises

References

Crises